Gerhardus Johannes Olivier (born 17 February 1993) is a South African retired professional rugby union player who last played for the  in the Pro14 and the  in the Currie Cup. He regularly played as a loose-forward, but was also able to play as a lock.

Career

Youth

Olivier first represented Bloemfontein-based side Free State at high school level, playing as a lock for them at the Under-18 Craven Week competition held in Welkom in 2010, helping the Free State to a 42–21 victory over their Western Province counterparts in the main match of the competition. He again represented the Free State at the 2011 event held in Kimberley, where they were crowned unofficial champions for the second season in a row, this time beating the Golden Lions in the main match. He was also included in the  squad, making three appearances for them in the 2011 Under-19 Provincial Championship.

In 2013, his only provincial action came in two appearances for the  side during the 2013 Under-21 Provincial Championship, scoring one try in their match against the s.

UFS Shimlas / Free State Cheetahs

The following year, Olivier played for  during the 2014 Varsity Cup. He made four appearances as a number eight during the competition as Shimlas finished fifth on the log to miss out on the semi-finals. He again represented the  side in 2014, appearing in all thirteen of their matches in the 2014 Under-21 Provincial Championship. He scored a brace of tries in their match against the s and scored one each in the return leg against  and against  as Free State finished fourth on the log before losing 17–41 to the s in the semi-final.

Despite not scoring in the play-offs, Olivier's eight tries during the competition was still enough to make him the joint-top try scorer with Shimlas teammate Daniel Maartens. Olivier was also selected to represent a Varsity Cup Dream Team, playing off the bench in their one-off match against the South Africa Under-20 team in Stellenbosch.

Cheetahs

Notes

References

South African rugby union players
Living people
1993 births
People from Ficksburg
Rugby union locks
Rugby union flankers
Rugby union number eights
Cheetahs (rugby union) players
Free State Cheetahs players
Rugby union players from the Free State (province)